Jordan Wetria (born on 7 July 1994), is a New Caledonian professional football player who plays for the New Caledonian national team.

He debuted internationally on 18 March 2022 in a 2022 FIFA World Cup qualifying match against Fiji where he scored his first goal for New Caledonia against Fiji in a 1–2 defeat.

References

1994 births
Living people
New Caledonian footballers
New Caledonia international footballers
Association football forwards